Paparoa is a settlement in Northland, New Zealand. The Paparoa Stream flows from the east, through the settlement, and into the Paparoa Creek to the south, which joins the Arapaoa River which is part of the Kaipara Harbour. State Highway 12 passes through Paparoa. Matakohe is 6 km to the south west, and Maungaturoto is 12 km east.

The New Zealand Ministry for Culture and Heritage gives a translation of "long flats" for Paparoa.

History and culture

European settlement
Paparoa was one of several Kaipara settlements established by a religious group known as Albertlanders. Port Albert near Wellsford was the main settlement, and Matakohe was another. They settled at the Paparoa Block in 1863. The land was burnt off so that corn and grass could be planted.

A road was constructed to the port at Pahi in 1865, and one to Matakohe shortly afterwards. A pottery using local clay and a factory making rope and matting from flax operated in the 1870s, and brick and tile yards were established, but their business suffered from the poor roads and high freight charges. The nearest stores were in Pahi,  to the south.

The steamer Minnie Casey connected Paparoa with Helensville on the south side of the Kaipara with a weekly service from 1882, and the S.S. Ethel took over from 1891–95, after which services went only to Matakohe and Pahi. The network of roads in the area were improved in the 1880s and 1890s.

20th century

In the 1890s, Paparoa had 35 families and about 200 people, mostly living along the banks of the Paparoa River. Including Pahi, there were 400 people in the area. By 1906, the population of Paparoa had doubled. Pastoral farming became established in the area, and a dairy factory was opened in Paparoa in January 1895. A branch of a Helensville-based department store was operating in the town in the 1900s.
 
The North Auckland railway line reached Huarau, to the east of Paparoa, in the early 1920s. A route through Paparoa was planned at one stage but this did not eventuate. The road to Maungaturoto, which passes through Huarau, was metalled in 1922.

Marae

The local Ōtamatea marae and its Aotearoa wharenui are a tribal meeting place for Ngāti Whātua and Te Uri o Hau.

Demographics
Paparoa is part of the larger Otamatea statistical area.

Paparoa had a population of 357 at the 2018 New Zealand census, an increase of 27 people (8.2%) since the 2013 census, and an increase of 87 people (32.2%) since the 2006 census. There were 141 households, comprising 186 males and 177 females, giving a sex ratio of 1.05 males per female, with 69 people (19.3%) aged under 15 years, 54 (15.1%) aged 15 to 29, 162 (45.4%) aged 30 to 64, and 72 (20.2%) aged 65 or older.

Ethnicities were 91.6% European/Pākehā, 11.8% Māori, 2.5% Pacific peoples, 3.4% Asian, and 0.8% other ethnicities. People may identify with more than one ethnicity.

Although some people chose not to answer the census's question about religious affiliation, 34.5% had no religion, 58.0% were Christian and 1.7% had other religions.

Of those at least 15 years old, 27 (9.4%) people had a bachelor's or higher degree, and 63 (21.9%) people had no formal qualifications. 51 people (17.7%) earned over $70,000 compared to 17.2% nationally. The employment status of those at least 15 was that 120 (41.7%) people were employed full-time, 48 (16.7%) were part-time, and 6 (2.1%) were unemployed.

Otamatea statistical area
Otamatea statistical area includes Pahi, and surrounds but does not include Maungaturoto.

Otamatea statistical area had a population of 1,713 at the 2018 New Zealand census, an increase of 231 people (15.6%) since the 2013 census, and an increase of 306 people (21.7%) since the 2006 census. There were 687 households, comprising 879 males and 834 females, giving a sex ratio of 1.05 males per female. The median age was 47.2 years (compared with 37.4 years nationally), with 348 people (20.3%) aged under 15 years, 234 (13.7%) aged 15 to 29, 744 (43.4%) aged 30 to 64, and 387 (22.6%) aged 65 or older.

Ethnicities were 90.7% European/Pākehā, 17.0% Māori, 2.5% Pacific peoples, 1.4% Asian, and 1.4% other ethnicities. People may identify with more than one ethnicity.

The percentage of people born overseas was 12.3, compared with 27.1% nationally.

Although some people chose not to answer the census's question about religious affiliation, 50.3% had no religion, 37.8% were Christian, 1.8% had Māori religious beliefs, 0.5% were Hindu, 0.4% were Buddhist and 2.1% had other religions.

Of those at least 15 years old, 147 (10.8%) people had a bachelor's or higher degree, and 309 (22.6%) people had no formal qualifications. The median income was $23,600, compared with $31,800 nationally. 147 people (10.8%) earned over $70,000 compared to 17.2% nationally. The employment status of those at least 15 was that 555 (40.7%) people were employed full-time, 246 (18.0%) were part-time, and 51 (3.7%) were unemployed.

Notable people
Alex Tait, cricketer, born in Paparoa.
James Wright, potter, worked in Paparoa in the mid-1870s.
Lockwood Smith, politician, born in Paparoa.
Sam Hunt, poet, lives in Paparoa.

Education
Paparoa School is a coeducational contributing primary (years 1-6) school with a roll of  students as of  The school was established in 1870, and had a roll ranging from 27 to 42 students up to 1899.

Notes

Kaipara District
Populated places in the Northland Region